The 1943 Del Monte Pre-Flight Seahawks football team represented the United States Navy's Del Monte Pre-Flight School during the 1943 college football season. The school was located at the Hotel Del Monte in Del Monte, California (annexed in 1948 into Monterey, California), The team compiled a 7–1 record, outscored opponents by a total of 252 to 65, and was ranked No. 8 in the final AP Poll.

Bill Kern, who had been the head coach at Carnegie Tech and West Virginia prior to the war, was the team's head coach. The team included a number of athletes who were then serving in the Navy. Notable players include: Paul Christman, an All-American quarterback at Missouri; Parker Hall, an All-American back out of Ole Miss who played in the NFL from 1939 to 1942; Len Eshmont, a back who played in the NFL in 1941; Ed Cifers, an end who played in the NFL from 1941 to 1942; Bowden Wyatt, an end out of Tennessee; and Jim McDonald, a back who played in the NFL from 1938 to 1939.

Schedule

References

Del Monte Pre-Flight
Del Monte Pre-Flight Navyators football
Del Monte Pre-Flight Navyators football